Koijärvi is a former municipality of Finland in the former Häme Province, now in Tavastia Proper. It was split between Forssa and Urjala in 1969, most of the land was given to Forssa.

In 1979, Koijärvi and the homonymous lake became known for the Koijärvi movement, which spawned the political party Vihreät.

Geography

Villages 
Kojo (Koijärven kirkonkylä)
Raitoo
Lempää
Kalsu
Matku
Peräjoki
Saviniemi
Suonpää
Vuoltu

Lakes 
The homonymous lake Koijärvi, from which the Koijoki river starts, is known for the birds which make their nests by it.

Distances 
Forssa: ~20 km
Hämeenlinna: 70 km
Tampere: 75 km
Turku: 95 km
Pori: 110 km
Helsinki: 130 km

History

Before separation 
Koijärvi is named after a nearby lake. While Koijärvi literally means "moth lake", it is not the original name: it was most likely Koivujärvi or "birch lake" instead.

The main village, Kojo, has existed at least since the 17th century. The first mention of it was in 1600 as Quoiuull, "at Kojo" (adessive case, in modern Finnish orthography written Kojolla. Many Tavastian dialects have an apocope of a, pronouncing it as Kojol). The area was mainly within the Tammela parish, originally called Porras.

Independent municipality 
Koijärvi became a separate municipality in 1923. It was formed out of parts of Tammela and Urjala. Forssa was also separated from Tammela in the same year.

The old meeting house in Kojo was converted into a church in the 16th of December, 1923. The altarpiece is painted by Elias Muukka. The organ was made in Kangasala in 1968, while the bells were made in Yaroslavl and were originally used in a church built for Russian soldiers in Tammisaari.

Koijärvi was one of the two municipalities without a coat of arms in the 60s, the other being Uudenkaupungin maalaiskunta.

Merger 

The Koijärvi municipality was dissolved in 1969. Most of it, including Kojo, was transferred to Forssa in the south, while small portions of the north were given to Urjala.

Services 

Most of Koijärvi's services are located in Kojo.

Education 
Kojo has a school for grades 1-6 (ala-aste). A daycare is located in the same building.

Commercial 
There is a small grocery store in Kojo.

References 

Forssa
Former municipalities of Finland